1180 Peachtree, commonly known as the Symphony Tower, is a 41-story skyscraper located at 1180 Peachtree Street in the Midtown district of Atlanta, Georgia, United States. Construction was completed in 2006.

Designed by architectural firm Pickard Chilton of Connecticut, 1180 Peachtree incorporates various environmental innovations that achieved the prestigious U.S. Green Building Council's Leadership in Energy and Environmental Design (LEED) gold certification. This building is marked on the skyline by two sweeping glass fins extending upwards from the north and south walls. These fins are illuminated from inside at night for a dramatic skyline presence, giving what is considered to be a Gothic feel.

Kendall/Heaton Associates, Inc., Houston, TX served as the Architect of Record for 1180 Peachtree. Turner Construction was the construction manager for the project.

Over 60% of the tower's leasable space is occupied by Atlanta-based law firm King & Spalding as its international headquarters. The firm was previously located in downtown's 191 Peachtree Tower.

The building is intended to be the campanile of the Woodruff Arts Center's proposed Atlanta Symphony Center, which is designed by Spanish architect Santiago Calatrava and was planned to occupy land adjacent to the structure along 14th Street. The $300 million Symphony Center will not begin construction until fundraising goals are met.

References in popular culture
 The building is featured in detail in the 2009 Channel 4 series Vertical City (series 1, episode 11).

See also
 List of tallest buildings in Atlanta

References

External links
 Official building site
 Photographs and information about 1180 Peachtree

Hines Interests Limited Partnership
Skyscraper office buildings in Atlanta
Buildings and structures completed in 2006
Leadership in Energy and Environmental Design gold certified buildings